Granville Mall can refer to two different locations:
Granville Mall, Halifax, a pedestrian mall in Halifax
Granville Mall, Vancouver, a transit and pedestrian mall in Vancouver